David Majak Chan (born 10 October 2000) is a South Sudanese footballer who plays as a striker.

Career

Club career

Majak started his career with Kenyan side Kakamega Homeboyz. In 2019, Majak signed for Tusker in Kenya, where he was accused of forging birth certificates. In 2021, he signed for Swedish top flight club Kalmar. After that, Majak was sent on loan to IFK Luleå in the Swedish third division.

International career

He is eligible to represent Kenya internationally, having lived there for over 12 years.

References

External links
 

Living people
2000 births
Expatriate footballers in Sweden
Kalmar FF players
Association football forwards
IFK Luleå players
Kakamega Homeboyz F.C. players
Tusker F.C. players
Mt Kenya United F.C. players
Kenyan Premier League players
Ettan Fotboll players
South Sudanese expatriate footballers
South Sudan international footballers
South Sudanese footballers